The Conton family is a Sierra Leone Creole family of Bermudan, Barbadian, French and Liberated African descent based in Freetown, Sierra Leone with roots in Bermuda, Barbados, Guinea, and France.

Prominent members of the family include William Farquhar Conton  born on 5 September 1925 in Bathurst, Gambia, to the union of Cecil Conton (1885–1926) and Olive Conton, née Farquhar. The Contons and Farquhars were first-generation Sierra Leone Creoles of Caribbean origin who settled in Sierra Leone during the late nineteenth century. Cecil Barger Conton had been born in Bermuda to William A. Conton (b. 1837) and Elizabeth Conton (b. 1857). Olive Farquhar was the daughter of Archdeacon Charles William Farquhar, (d. 1928) of Barbados, a missionary in French Guinea.

Bertha Conton who is the principal, founder, and proprietress of Leone Preparatory School, was born in French Guinea of Sierra Leonean provenance and was educated at St. Joseph's Primary School and subsequently at St. Joseph's Convent School in Freetown, Sierra Leone. She completed her post-secondary school education in Liverpool, England. She was married to William Farquhar Conton, an educator, historian, and author.

References

Sierra Leone Creole people
Sierra Leone Creole families
People from Freetown
Sierra Leonean Christians
African people of Caribbean descent
Sierra Leonean people of French descent
Sierra Leonean people of Caribbean descent 
Sierra Leonean people of Barbadian descent
Sierra Leonean people of Bermudian descent
Sierra Leonean people of British descent
People of Sierra Leone Creole descent